Jan Tadeusz Andrykiewicz (born 14 June 1953) is a Polish farmer and politician from the Polish People's Party. He served as member of the Sejm from 1993 to 1997 and was a candidate for the European Parliament in 2004.

References

1953 births
Living people
People from Lubusz Voivodeship
Polish People's Party politicians
Members of the Polish Sejm 1993–1997